Jeremy Pikser is an American screenwriter. Pikser is best known for Bulworth (co-written with Warren Beatty), which was nominated for Academy, Golden Globe and WGA Awards for Best Screenplay, and won the Los Angeles Film Critics' Best Screenplay award for 1998.

Pikser got his start working as a "special consultant" and uncredited writer on the film Reds (a screenplay also co-written by Beatty nominated for an Academy Award).  He wrote The Lemon Sisters, starring Diane Keaton, Carol Kane, Elliott Gould, Kathryn Grody, and Ruben Blades,  and War, Inc. (co-written with Mark Leyner and John Cusack), starring Cusack, Marisa Tomei, Ben Kingsley, and Hilary Duff, which premiered at the 2008 Tribeca Film Festival in New York City.  He was "supervising writer" for Pink Subaru, which opened at the Turin Film Festival in 2009.

Pikser teaches screenwriting at New York University in the Rita and Burton Goldberg department of dramatic writing at the Tisch School of the Arts, and at Johns Hopkins University in the MA in Film and Media program at the Krieger School of Arts and Sciences. He is the creative director of the Saul Zaentz Innovation Fund Screenwriting Lab. Pikser is a regular advisor at the Sundance Screenwriters' Lab.  He is also an occasional contributor to The Huffington Post and he has commented on the writer's strike and other subjects on The Guardian website Comment Is Free.

Pikser cut his activist teeth at Oberlin College, where he was a leading opponent of the Vietnam War, and was one of the authors and organizers of the Not in Our Name Statement of Conscience opposing the US invasions of Afghanistan and Iraq.

In 2019, as WGA-E Vice President, Pikser oversaw the negotiating committee for the "WGA-Agency Agreement", and joined other WGA members in firing his agents as part of the guild's stand against the ATA after the two sides were unable to come to an agreement on a new "Code of Conduct" that addressed the practice of packaging.

References

External links

American male screenwriters
New York University faculty
Living people
Screenwriters from New York (state)
Year of birth missing (living people)